Henrique Madeira Casimiro  (born 22 April 1986) is a Portuguese cyclist, who currently rides for UCI Continental team .

Major results

2013
 3rd Overall Troféu Joaquim Agostinho
2014
 8th Time trial, National Road Championships
2016
 8th Overall GP Beiras e Serra da Estrela
 8th Overall Troféu Joaquim Agostinho
 7th Overall Volta a Portugal
 8th Overall Volta Internacional Cova da Beira
2017
 2nd Overall Vuelta a Castilla y León
 8th Overall Volta a Portugal
2018
 2nd Overall Troféu Joaquim Agostinho
1st  Points classification
1st Stage 4
 3rd Road race, National Road Championships
 4th Overall GP Beiras e Serra da Estrela
 10th Overall Volta a Portugal
2019
 1st  Overall Troféu Joaquim Agostinho
1st  Points classification
1st  Mountains classification
 3rd Clássica Aldeias do Xisto
 9th Overall GP Beiras e Serra da Estrela
1st  Mountains classification
10th Overall Volta a Portugal
2020
 7th Road race, National Road Championships
2021
 10th Overall Volta a Portugal

References

External links

1986 births
Living people
Portuguese male cyclists
People from Aarau

Swiss people of Portuguese descent